Letničie is a village and municipality in Skalica District in the Trnava Region of western Slovakia.

Mayor Marián Dvorský was elected in 2010. Deputy mayor is Mgr Katarína Smolinská.

History
In historical records the village was first mentioned in 1532.

Monuments
There is the Roman Catholic Church of St. John the Baptist since 1822, and a Pieta built to honor a soldier killed in the First World War. Near the church there is a memorial of heroes killed in the Slovak National Uprising. At the municipal office building is a memorial plaque of Anton Vaculka who died in the village of Haj.

Geography
The municipality lies at an altitude of 210 metres and covers an area of 6.701 km². It has a population of about 527 people.

References

External links

 Official page

Villages and municipalities in Skalica District